The Uts or Vuts (Belorussian:Уць or Вуць, Russian:Уть), is a  river in the Gomel Region of Belarus.

The Uts flows on the territory of Dobrush District and Gomel District and is a left tributary of the Sozh.

External links 

Rivers of Gomel Region
Rivers of Belarus